Mürsəlliqışlaq (also, Mirzakishlak, Mursaali-Kishlyagi, and Myursallikyshlak) is a village in the Khachmaz Rayon of Azerbaijan.  The village forms part of the municipality of Qobuqıraq.

References 

Populated places in Khachmaz District